The Stadio Rino Mercante is a multi-use sports stadium in Bassano del Grappa, Italy. It hosted the UCI Track Cycling World Championships in 1985, the national track cycling championships on a number of occasions and in road bicycle racing, the finish of the Giro del Veneto from 1970 to 1980 and the finish of a stage of the Giro d'Italia in 1946, 1949, 1968, 1970 and 1974.

External links
BassanoVirtus.com

Bassano Virtus 55 S.T.
Sports venues in Italy
Velodromes in Italy
Cycle racing in Italy